Takao Tanabe,  (born 16 September 1926) is a Canadian artist who painted abstractly for decades, but over time, his paintings became nature-based.

Biography
Born Takao Izumi in Seal Cove, today part of Prince Rupert, British Columbia, the son of a commercial fisherman, where he was the fifth of seven children. Tanabe and his family were interned with other Japanese-Canadians in the British Columbia interior during World War II. They were relocated first to a camp at Hasting Park in Vancouver and the Lemon Creek internment camp in the Kootenays in the summer of 1942. Tanabe attended the Winnipeg School of Art, Winnipeg, Manitoba (1946–1949), studying with Lionel LeMoine FitzGerald, and Joseph Plaskett. He then studied at the Brooklyn Museum Art School, New York City, New York with Hans Hofmann (1951) and Reuben Tam (1951-1952). He received an Emily Carr Scholarship and went to the Central School of Arts and Crafts, London, UK  (1953–1954) and during that time, travelled widely in Europe. From 1959 to 1960, he studied ￼￼Sumi-e￼￼ and ￼￼calligraphy￼￼ at ￼￼Tokyo University￼￼ in Japan on a Canada Council Scholarship.

His works are in public and private collections, including the National Gallery of Canada, the Glenbow Museum, the Vancouver Art Gallery, the Canada Council Art Bank, the Art Gallery of Greater Victoria and the Art Gallery of Ontario.

Career
His art has gone through different phases. In his "inscapes" (he called his paintings after a term used by Gerald Manley Hopkins) of the late 1950s, Tanabe explored his memories of lit interiors, painting them abstractly and expressing them with calligraphic signs. From 1961 to 1968, Tanabe taught at the Vancouver Art School. In 1968, he worked in Philadelphia, moving in 1969 to New York City where he lived until 1972. In New York, he painted hard-edge geometric abstracts. From 1973, he was head of the art program and artist-in-residence at the Banff Centre for the Arts. By then, he consciously considered landscapes as a subject, while progressively eliminating references to the specific. In 1980, he returned to British Columbia where he lives and works on Vancouver Island. He is considered today a painter who primarily evokes the landscape of British Columbia in minimalist paintings.

In 2005, a major retrospective of his work curated by Ian Thom was organized and circulated by the Art Gallery of Greater Victoria and Vancouver Art Gallery.

In 2014, Tanabe said:
...I try to avoid brush marks so that it looks as though the paint has just floated on...

Awards
 Member of the Order of Canada
 Order of British Columbia
 two honorary doctorates
 Governor General's Award in Visual and Media Arts
 Member, Royal Canadian Academy of Arts
 Audain Prize for Lifetime Achievement in the Visual Arts (2013)

Selected Publications 
"Takao Tanabe" (2005), Ian M. Thom, Roald Nasgaard, Nancy Tousley, and Jeffrey Spalding, (Vancouver Art Gallery and Victoria Art Gallery) ISBN: 9781553651413 

"Chronicles of Form and Place : Works on Paper by Takao Tanabe" (2012), Darren J. Marten, Ihor Holibizky, Denise Leclerc (Burnaby Art Gallery) ISBN: 9780980996296

References

External links
Takao Tanabe exhibition at the Vancouver Art Gallery, 21 January 2006 – 17 April 2006
Takao Tanabe at the Mira Godard Gallery
Takao Tanabe information at gc.ca
Bilingual website for the touring exhibition "Takao Tanabe: Chronicles of Form and Place", organized and circulated by the Burnaby Art Gallery and the McMaster Museum of Art
Records of Takao Tanabe and Periwinkle Press are held by Simon Fraser University's Special Collections and Rare Books
Takao Tanabe fonds at the National Gallery of Canada, Ottawa, Ontario

1926 births
Living people
Canadian painters
Members of the Order of British Columbia
Members of the Order of Canada
People from Prince Rupert, British Columbia
Japanese-Canadian internees
Members of the Royal Canadian Academy of Arts
Governor General's Award in Visual and Media Arts winners
Canadian expatriates in the United States
Canadian expatriates in the United Kingdom
Canadian expatriates in Japan